Govindapuram is a small village in Kollengode Block, Palakkad district of Kerala, India.

References

Villages in Palakkad district